Přibyslavice is a municipality and village in Brno-Country District in the South Moravian Region of the Czech Republic. It has about 500 inhabitants.

Administrative parts
The village of Radoškov is an administrative part of Přibyslavice.

References

Villages in Brno-Country District